Denis Garon (born 10 March 1963) is a Canadian weightlifter. He competed at the 1984 Summer Olympics, the 1988 Summer Olympics and the 1992 Summer Olympics.

References

External links
 

1963 births
Living people
Canadian male weightlifters
Olympic weightlifters of Canada
Weightlifters at the 1984 Summer Olympics
Weightlifters at the 1988 Summer Olympics
Weightlifters at the 1992 Summer Olympics
Sportspeople from Quebec City
Commonwealth Games medallists in weightlifting
Commonwealth Games gold medallists for Canada
Pan American Games medalists in weightlifting
Pan American Games gold medalists for Canada
Weightlifters at the 1987 Pan American Games
Weightlifters at the 1986 Commonwealth Games
20th-century Canadian people
21st-century Canadian people
Medallists at the 1986 Commonwealth Games